Inside Out is the sixth album released by Canadian country music singer Charlie Major. The album was written and produced entirely by Major. Among the tracks is his own rendition of "Backroads", a song which Major originally wrote for Ricky Van Shelton, who released it as a single from his 1991 album Backroads.

Track listing
All songs written by Charlie Major.
 "When You're Good, You're Good" - 3:41
 "You'd Better Go" - 4:05
 "I'm Still Looking" - 3:43
 "My Brother and Me" - 4:22
 "Just for Old Times" - 4:03
 "I'm Alright" - 3:03
 "Last Peaceful Place" - 4:30
 "The Face of Love" - 4:40
 "Nothing but Alone Again" - 4:04
 "Backroads" - 4:18

Personnel
 Eddie Bayers - drums
 J. T. Corenflos - electric guitar
 Dan Dugmore - acoustic guitar
 B. James Lowry - acoustic guitar 
 Brent Mason - electric guitar
 Mike McAdam - mandolin
 Garry Primm - piano
 Michael Rhodes - bass
 Popcorn Rondini - accordion
 Harry Stinson - backing vocals, percussion
 Pete Wasmer - organ
 Joy Lynn White - backing vocals

External links
 [ allmusic.com]

Charlie Major albums
2004 albums
Stony Plain Records albums